The Boleyn Tavern is a Grade II listed public house in East Ham, East London, England at the junction of Barking Road and Green Street.

It was built in 1899–1900, with the entrance consoles bearing a 1900 date. The Tavern was frequented by West Ham United F.C. supporters due to its proximity to West Ham's ground, the Boleyn Ground. Often at risk from vandalism from opposing supporters, it would have its windows boarded up for a local derby such as West Ham and Millwall.

It is on the Campaign for Real Ale's National Inventory of Historic Pub Interiors.

A visit from Gandhi
The local tradition is that Mahatma Gandhi visited the Boleyn Tavern at least once in 1931. In that year Gandhi was in London for three months for talks on the future of India; he was based at Kingsley Hall in Bromley-by-Bow, and was enthusiastically received by East Enders.

It is said that Gandhi attended several West Ham games during his stay and visited the Boleyn Tavern, where he drank cream soda while discussing football and radical politics with local people. Gandhi was a keen football fan, establishing three teams in South Africa, and already had a strong connection to West Ham through his friendship with its founder, Arnold Hills, while living in London completing his law studies in 1888–91. During this period Hills brought the young Gandhi onto the executive committee of the London Vegetarian Society.
 
Gandhi took long early-morning walks during his 1931 stay in London, and often used the nearby Sewerbank (or Greenway) between Stratford and Plaistow. Gandhi met Charlie Chaplin in nearby Canning Town.

References

Grade II listed buildings in the London Borough of Newham
Grade II listed pubs in London
West Ham United F.C.
National Inventory Pubs
East Ham
Pubs in the London Borough of Newham
Commercial buildings completed in 1900